Ephestiopsis oenobarella is a moth of the family Pyralidae. It is known from Australia. It has also been introduced into New Zealand.

References

Moths described in 1879
Phycitini
Taxa named by Edward Meyrick
Moths of Australia